The Sweyne Park School is a coeducational secondary school situated in Rayleigh, Essex, England, with specialised provision for hearing-impaired pupils. The school was formed in September 1997 following the amalgamation of Sweyne School and Park School. The Headteacher is Katharine Dines who took the position in April 2019, following from Andy Hodgkinson MA (Oxon), who resigned due to family illness

The school is an 11-18 academy (with a roll of 1,240 pupils), having opened a sixth form in September 2014. The sixth form has a maximum roll of 140 students, including 15 external students, who will be admitted in Year 12.

In 2007, the school embarked on its journey to become a Thinking School, which has been instrumental in the school’s continued success, including gaining an Ofsted ‘Outstanding’ rating in 2010.

Awards 
The school has achieved a number of awards since it opened. The following awards have been awarded or re-accredited since 2010:
International School Award
Investors in People Gold Award

References

Secondary schools in Essex
Rayleigh, Essex
1997 establishments in England
Educational institutions established in 1997
Academies in Essex